Bolgatanga East District is one of the fifteen districts in Upper East Region, Ghana. Originally it was formerly part of the then-larger Bolgatanga District in 1988; until the eastern part of the district was later split off to create Bolgatanga East District on 15 March 2018, which was established by Legislative Instrument (L.I.) 2350; thus the remaining part has been retained as Bolgatanga Municipal District. The district assembly is located in the central part of Upper East Region and has Zuarungu as its capital town.

Sources

References

Districts of Upper East Region